Pururaj Singh (born 24 December 1980) is an Indian former cricketer. He played two first-class matches for Delhi in 2003.

See also
 List of Delhi cricketers

References

External links
 

1980 births
Living people
Indian cricketers
Delhi cricketers
Cricketers from Delhi